The Bitcrusher Remixes is remix album by Christ Analogue, released on December 7, 2004, by Architecture and Flagrant Records.

Track listing

Personnel
Adapted from The Bitcrusher Remixes liner notes.

Christ Analogue
 Wade Alin – lead vocals, programming, production

Release history

References

External links 
 The Bitcrusher Remixes at Discogs (list of releases)

2004 remix albums
Christ Analogue albums
Albums produced by Wade Alin